ZAM or "ZAM-1", "Z A M : S.A.C.-1; M.S.A." is the acronym of an Australian Melbourne-based Artist and Designer, also known for his early pioneering spray-can art (graffiti artist) career during the 1980s.

Z.A.M. initially was a conventional gallery artist during early adolescence (including published book illustrations), before exploring the U.S. graffiti/street art phenomenon in the early 1980s, then later evolving into a contemporary unconventional artist and designer.

References
3. Art Almanac, The Australian Gallery Guide -1987; 1990; 1991; 1994; 1997; et al. [1] et al. 

4. The Herald Newspaper (pre-Herald Sun), Melbourne -1990; et al. 

5. The Sunday Age Newspaper, Melbourne -1990; et al. 

6. The Geelong Advertiser Newspaper, -1982; 1987; 1988; 1989; et al. 

7. Kings Way -the book: The Beginnings of Australian Graffiti: Melbourne 1983-1993, - published 2009;

External links
 ZAM site dedicated to ZAM mural art

Australian painters
Australian graffiti artists
Australian illustrators
Visionary artists
Artists from Melbourne